Ithiel (Hebrew אִיתִיאֵל ’Îṯî’êl) is an enigmatic name mentioned in the Biblical verse of Proverbs 30:1, "The words of Agur the son of Jakeh, the oracle. The man declares to Ithiel, to Ithiel and Ucal..."(Masoretic Text: "...utterance to Ithiel, / to Ithiel and Ukal:") then follows the prophecy.

Origin
The name is angelic in origin, having the Hebrew suffix -iel, Yodh, Aleph, Lamed, and can have a number of meanings.

Etymology
The name, Ithiel, has as its root a variation of the word ot (אוֹתּ) meaning "sign" and can be rendered as "the words of God," "he who understood the signs," or "he who understood the alphabet of God." Relating to the letters of the Hebrew alphabet, the root word ot also signifies "letters."

Description
The Irish abbot and missionary Saint Columba mentions Ithiel, along with Uriel, as one of seven angels charged with taking care of a monastery in his ode "Farewell".

Arthur Cleveland Coxe, in his book Advent: a Mystery, treats Ithiel as an angel in conversation with the counterpart Adiel and writes their dialogue in the form of a play.

Charles Morgridge has described the angel Ithiel as "prince of the seventh or lowest order of the hierarchy of heaven" and of being the weight of judgment for the men of God.

In Gematria
In Hebrew Gematria, Ithiel is 452 which has an exact correspondence to the Greek words meizonos (μειζονος) and krithete (κριθητε), which, when placed together mean “great judge.”

Occultist Arimanius Théletos, who created the Magic Square of Ithiel, has used it to derive an evocation of Ithiel that can be used in magic ritual.  The words of the evocation are Hebrew renderings of phrases drawn from the Magic Square of Ithiel.  It begins with the palindrome “le-Ithiel” (לְאִיתִיאֵל), meaning "to Ithiel" which can be read along each side of the magic square.  Other phrases such as “Abba” (father) and “yomar” (he will say) are also encoded within the cryptic message of the cipher.  Each other palindrome inside the magic square form barbarous names, which are corrupted names of deities particularly used in magical evocations.  According to Rosemary Guiley barbarous names are used "to command all spirits of the firmament, ether, and the elements."

Due to the nature of the magic square each phrase can be read in four different directions.  The evocation attributed to Arimanius Théletos has been rendered from Hebrew to English thus:

L'BAMAOMABAL L'ITIEL,
ABATzABA YOMARAMOY,
TATzARO'ORATzATA, TATzARO'ORATzATA
L'BAMAOMABAL, L'BAMAOMABAL
TATzARO'ORATzATA, TATzARO'ORATzATA
YOMARAMOY ABATzABA,
L'ITIEL L'BAMAOMABAL.

References

Book of Proverbs
Hebrew Bible people